Dwarf alder may refer to various plants:

Rhamnus alnifolia, native to North America
Alnus alnobetula subsp. fruticosa
Fothergilla major

Similar names
Dwarf elder